Cissokho is a surname. Notable people with the surname include:

Aly Cissokho (born 1987), French footballer 
Kalidou Cissokho (born 1978), Senegalese footballer

See also
Sissoko